The 2017 WNBA season was the 21st season for the Phoenix Mercury franchise of the WNBA. The season began on May 14.

Transactions

WNBA Draft

Current roster

Game log

Preseason 

|- style="background:#fcc;"
| 1
| May 3
| Seattle
| L 64–86
| Prince (12)
| Cannon (6)
| Spencer (5)
| KeyArena  4,128
| 0–1
|- style="background:#bbffbb;"
| 2
| May 7
| Seattle
| W 72–55
| 2 Tied (16)
| George (6)
| Mitchell (5)
| Talking Stick Resort Arena  4,088
| 1–1

Regular season

|- style="background:#fcc;"
| 1
| May 14
| Dallas
| L 58–68
| Griner (18)
| 2 Tied (5)
| D. Robinson (9)
| Talking Stick Resort Arena  9,640
| 0–1
|- style="background:#bbffbb;"
| 2
| May 17
| Indiana
| W 85–62
| Griner (32)
| Griner (10)
| Mitchell (7)
| Talking Stick Resort Arena  8,896
| 1–1
|- style="background:#bbffbb;"
| 3
| May 19
| San Antonio
| W 78–72
| Griner (20)
| Griner (13)
| D. Robinson (5)
| AT&T Center  6,400
| 2–1
|- style="background:#fcc;"
| 4
| May 23
| New York
| L 67–69
| Griner (19)
| Griner (6)
| 2 Tied (5)
| Talking Stick Resort Arena  7,886
| 2–2
|- style="background:#bbffbb;"
| 5
| May 27
| Dallas
| W 107–65
| Taurasi (18)
| Cannon (8)
| D. Robinson (7)
| Talking Stick Resort Arena  9,245
| 3–2

|- style="background:#bbffbb;"
| 6
| June 1
| Chicago
| W 99–91
| Taurasi (37)
| Griner (13)
| D. Robinson (6)
| Allstate Arena  4,634
| 4–2
|- style="background:#fcc;"
| 7
| June 4
| New York
| L 72–88
| Griner (26)
| George (5)
| Griner (4)
| Madison Square Garden  7,831
| 4–3
|- style="background:#bbffbb;"
| 8
| June 7
| Indiana
| W 98–90
| Griner (38)
| Griner (9)
| Mitchell (7)
| Bankers Life Fieldhouse  5,702
| 5–3
|- style="background:#fcc;"
| 9
| June 10
| Los Angeles
| L 87–89
| Taurasi (27)
| Griner (9)
| Griner (5)
| Talking Stick Resort Arena  10,223
| 5–4
|- style="background:#bbffbb;"
| 10
| June 16
| Chicago
| W 86–78
| Griner (27)
| Griner (9)
| Taurasi (5)
| Talking Stick Resort Arena  10,249
| 6–4
|- style="background:#fcc;"
| 11
| June 18
| Los Angeles
| L 59–90
| Taurasi (19)
| Mitchell (7)
| Mitchell (5)
| Staples Center  9,916
| 6–5
|- style="background:#bbffbb;"
| 12
| June 23
| Seattle
| W 85–82
| 2 Tied (25)
| Griner (9)
| Taurasi (4)
| KeyArena  7,796
| 7–5
|- style="background:#fcc;"
| 13
| June 30
| Minnesota
| L 83–91
| Little (16)
| A. Robinson (8)
| D. Robinson (3)
| Talking Stick Resort Arena  11,330
| 7–6

|- style="background:#bbffbb;"
| 14
| July 5
| Washington
| W 88–80
| Griner (30)
| Griner (14)
| Taurasi (4)
| Talking Stick Resort Arena7,440
| 8–6
|- style="background:#bbffbb;"
| 15
| July 7
| San Antonio
| W 92–77
| Taurasi (17)
| Griner (8)
| 3 Tied (5)
| AT&T Center8,232
| 9–6
|- style="background:#bbffbb;"
| 16
| July 9
| New York
| W 81–69
| Griner (31)
| Griner (13)
| D. Robinson (6)
| Talking Stick Resort Arena9,413
| 10–6
|- style="background:#bbffbb;"
| 17
| July 12
| Atlanta
| W 89–84
| Griner (28)
| Little (12)
| Little (6)
| Talking Stick Resort Arena9,342
| 11–6
|- style="background:#fcc;"
| 18
| July 14
| Minnesota
| L 71–88
| Griner (15)
| Mitchell (5)
| Talbot (4)
| Talking Stick Resort Arena10,493
| 11–7
|- style="background:#fcc;"
| 19
| July 16
| Minnesota
| L 66–81
| Turner (18)
| 3 Tied (6)
| Mitchell (4)
| Xcel Energy Center10,022
| 11–8
|- style="background:#fcc;"
| 20
| July 19
| Indiana
| L 77–84
| Taurasi (34)
| A. Robinson (8)
| Little (5)
| Talking Stick Resort Arena11,371
| 11–9
|- style="background:#fcc;"
| 21
| July 25
| Atlanta
| L 91–99
| Taurasi (31)
| A. Robinson (9)
| D. Robinson (8)
| McCamish Pavilion4,053
| 11–10
|- style="background:#bbffbb;"
| 22
| July 28
| Chicago
| W 86–80
| Little (19)
| George (14)
| Mitchell (5)
| Allstate Arena6,088
| 12–10
|- style="background:#bbffbb;"
| 23
| July 30
| San Antonio
| W 81–64
| Currie (20)
| 2 Tied (6)
| D. Robinson (4)
| Talking Stick Resort Arena10,108
| 13–10

|- style="background:#fcc;"
| 24
| August 4
| Connecticut
| L 92–93
| Taurasi (33)
| 3 Tied (5)
| Mitchell (8)
| Mohegan Sun Arena7,331
| 13–11
|- style="background:#fcc;"
| 25
| August 6
| Washington
| L80–85
| Taurasi (16)
| Currie (8)
| 2 Tied (5)
| Verizon Center7,414
| 13–12
|- style="background:#bbffbb;"
| 26
| August 10
| Dallas
| W 101–100
| Currie (29)
| Cannon (9)
| 2 Tied (7)
| College Park Center4,165
| 14–12
|- style="background:#fcc;"
| 27
| August 12
| Seattle
| L 89–98
| Taurasi (20)
| Cannon (9)
| Taurasi (4)
| Talking Stick Resort Arena11,797
| 14–13
|- style="background:#bbffbb;"
| 28
| August 18
| Washington
| W 89–79
| Taurasi (25)
| Griner (10)
| 3 Tied (4)
| Capital One Arena7,208
| 15–13
|- style="background:#fcc;"
| 29
| August 20
| Connecticut
| L 66–94
| Griner (18)
| Griner (6)
| Mitchell (3)
| Mohegan Sun Arena8,353
| 15–14
|- style="background:#fcc;"
| 30
| August 22
| Minnesota
| L 69–105
| Currie (14)
| Little (5)
| Turner (4)
| Xcel Energy Center10,723
| 15–15
|- style="background:#fcc;"
| 31
| August 24
| Los Angeles
| L 67–82
| Griner (18)
| Griner (6)
| Mitchell (6)
| Talking Stick Resort Arena9,890
| 15–16
|- style="background:#bbffbb;"
| 32
| August 27
| Seattle
| W 75–71
| Griner (29)
| 2 Tied (8)
| Currie (7)
| Key Arena13,882
| 16–16

|- style="background:#bbffbb;"
| 33
| September 1
| Connecticut
| W 86–66
| Griner (31)
| 2 Tied (8)
| Griner (5)
| Talking Stick Resort Arena9,971
| 17–16
|- style="background:#bbffbb;"
| 34
| September 3
| Atlanta
| W 84–70
| Griner (30)
| Cannon (10)
| 3 Tied (3)
| Talking Stick Resort Arena11,222
| 18–16

Playoffs

|- style="background:#bbffbb;"
| 1
| September 6
| Seattle
| W 79–69
| Griner (23)
| Griner (11)
| 3 Tied (3)
| Wells Fargo Arena  5,764
| 1–0

|- style="background:#bbffbb;"
| 1
| September 10
| Connecticut
| W 88–83
| Griner (26)
| Griner (9)
| Mitchell (5)
| Mohegan Sun Arena  8,420
| 1–0

|- style="background:#fcc;"
| 1
| September 12
| Los Angeles
| L 66–79
| Mitchell (19)
| Little (11)
| Mitchell (4)
| Staples Center7,963
| 0–1
|- style="background:#fcc;"
| 2
| September 14
| Los Angeles
| L 72–86
| Taurasi (32)
| Mitchell (6)
| Taurasi (4)
| Walter Pyramid4,023
| 0–2
|- style="background:#fcc;"
| 3
| September 17
| Los Angeles
| L 87–89
| Taurasi (22)
| 2 Tied (8)
| 2 Tied (5)
| Talking Stick Resort Arena  12,043
| 0–3

Standings

Playoffs

Awards and honors

References

External links
The Official Site of the Phoenix Mercury

Phoenix Mercury seasons
Phoenix Mercury